is a three-part CGI animated OVA by Studio Hibari, written and directed by Yoshitomo Yonetani with character designs by MA@YA. The soundtrack was composed by Mina Kubota and the theme song "Ya-chaouyo!" was composed by Dance Man.
A manga illustrated by Shinya Inase started serialization in the shōnen manga magazine Dengeki Daioh on November 21, 2007. One volume compiling the chapter was published by ASCII Media Works on January 27, 2009.

Plot
In the year 01 of the new age (2012), the sun began to radiate increased amounts of radiation. A few years later, very strong children with unique abilities, or 'Allergies', began to be born. Amuri Kakyoin is a 13-year-old girl born with a special 'Allergy', called 'Repulsion'. This ability keeps her from actually touching most of her environment, but also protects her from harm. During a trip to space station Pink Coral in year 019 (2030), unknown enemies from the junk planet Galapagos attack and destroy the entire space station. Amuri survives being launched into space because of her 'Allergy', but is picked up by the attackers. When the machines of Galapagos attempt to destroy her, a girl named Ling "Suzu" Yunque shows up with a kimono-like space suit designed from Amuri's DNA. The suit lets her use her 'Repulsion' ability on a large scale. Amuri has lived her whole life unable to touch other people, however, this cheerful and strange girl was not Repulsed upon contact.

Characters
 
 
 Amuri is a 13-year-old Japanese girl, and an Adapter born with an Allergy called Repulsion.
 
 
 Perrier is a 14-year-old French girl, and an Adapter born with an Allergy called Infiltration.
 
 
 Nicknamed Suzu, a 12-year-old Chinese girl, and an Adapter born with an Allergy called Escape.
 
 
 Pulmo is a three-year-old American girl. She is an Adapter with no special Allergies, but she is very mature for her age and is called "Professor".
 
 
 Maria is a 22-year-old Polish woman, and a normal human who works to help Adapters. She is Pulmo's caretaker.
 
 
 Deus is the father of Pulmo and president of Region Free, the Adapter support organization.
 
 
 Full name UKATAN 09203, a robot called a Puppet Agent resembling a plush rabbit doll. Belongs to Perrier.
 
 
 Femina is an 18-year-old British girl and the first known Adapter. She has an Allergy called Harmony.

Episodes

References

External links
 Hoshi no Umi no Amuri official website 
 

2007 manga
2008 anime OVAs
Dengeki Daioh
Kadokawa Dwango franchises
Science fiction anime and manga
Shōnen manga
Studio Hibari